iOTA (born 7 May 1968 as Sean Hape in Pinjarra) is a New Zealand-Australian singer-songwriter and actor. As a musician he has issued six studio albums and was nominated for Best Independent Release for The Hip Bone Connection (1999) at the ARIA Music Awards of 2000. He has won four Helpmann Awards: Best Male Actor in a Musical in 2007 for Hedwig in Hedwig and the Angry Inch (2006 Australian cast) and Best Cabaret Performer, Best New Australian Work and Best Original Score for his work in Smoke and Mirrors in 2010.

Personal life

iOTA has stated that his parents met in New Zealand; his father is Māori and his mother English. He grew up in Pinjarra, Western Australia, where his father worked at an alumina refinery.

At high school, iOTA took drama and music as electives, so he could "slack off for two hours"; he formed his first band, which was short-lived, at the age of 16.

iOTA moved out of home at age 17, into a caravan and lived for several years on the dole, while playing with a hard rock band called Loose Goose. He worked as a mechanic's apprentice before his career as an entertainer took off.

Loose Goose moved to Sydney, when iOTA was 23.

iOTA changed his name by deed poll when he was 26. iOTA has cited three reasons for this: wanting to begin a new identity as an entertainer, being openly gay, and being a recovering alcoholic.

Music 
iOTA's first album The Hip Bone Connection was released in 1999 and was nominated for ARIA Award for Best Independent Release. Following the release of the album, iOTA was labelled as an acoustic/blues/roots musician, a label he does not like. 

His second, Big Grandfather, was considered less accessible, more atmospheric and was not as successful as his first. His third, La Caravana, "is about the nomadic life of a musician". His fourth and most recent is Beauty Queen of the Sea and uses a full electric band, moving towards rock and away from his previous roots label.

In November 2019 it was announced that iOTA would be a participant in Eurovision - Australia Decides; in an attempt to represent Australia in the Eurovision Song Contest 2020. He competed with the song, "Life" and finished 9th.

Acting
As an actor, iOTA has performed on stage in Australia as an angel in Sydney Dance Company's Berlin, as Frank-N-Furter in The Rocky Horror Show, as Hedwig in Hedwig and the Angry Inch, and in the original productions Smoke & Mirrors and B-Girl.

His acting has won him Helpmann Awards for Best Male Actor in a Musical (for Hedwig and the Angry Inch) in 2007, and Best Cabaret Performer (for Smoke & Mirrors) in 2010.  He also received Helpmann Awards for Best New Australian Work and Best Original Score for Smoke & Mirrors.

He appeared in George Miller's 2015 film Mad Max: Fury Road (the fourth in the Mad Max series) as the Doof Warrior, a guitarist whose guitar is also a flamethrower. He has said he learned to act by necessity: "In the country, poofters are there to be bashed, or ridiculed. So I put on a mask, and became tough and rowdy: the long hair, the slouching, the spitting, lots of drinking piss."
iOTA can be seen in Baz Luhrmann's 2013 film The Great Gatsby as Trimalcio the orchestra leader.

He is one of two singers for the character of Walter Walrus on the animated Netflix series Beat Bugs, along with Daniel Johns.

Discography

Albums

Live albums

EPs

Singles

Awards and nominations

ARIA Music Awards
The ARIA Music Awards are a set of annual ceremonies presented by Australian Recording Industry Association (ARIA), which recognise excellence, innovation, and achievement across all genres of the music of Australia. They commenced in 1987. 

! 
|-
| 2000
| The Hip Bone Connection
| ARIA Award for Best Independent Release
| 
| 
|}

Helpmann Awards
The Helpmann Awards is an awards show, celebrating live entertainment and performing arts in Australia, presented by industry group Live Performance Australia since 2001. Note: 2020 and 2021 were cancelled due to the COVID-19 pandemic.
 

! 
|-
| 2007
| Iota - Hedwig and the Angry Inch
| Helpmann Award for Best Male Actor in a Musical
| 
| 
|-
| 2008
| Iota - Richard O'Brien's Rocky Horror Show
| Best Male Actor in a Musical
| 
| 
|-
|rowspan="3"|  2010
| Iota - Smoke & Mirrors
| Helpmann Award for Best Cabaret Performer
| 
|rowspan="3"| 
|-
| Iota - Smoke & Mirrors
| Helpmann Award for Best New Australian Work
| 
|-
| Iota - Smoke & Mirrors
| Helpmann Award for Best Original Score
| 
|-

References

1968 births
Living people
Australian male singers
Australian male songwriters
Australian male musical theatre actors
Helpmann Award winners
Australian gay actors
Australian gay musicians
Gay singers
Gay songwriters
Australian LGBT singers
Australian LGBT songwriters
People from Pinjarra, Western Australia
Musicians from Western Australia
Australian people of English descent
Australian people of Māori descent
New Zealand people of Māori descent
New Zealand people of English descent
Australian people of New Zealand descent
21st-century Australian male actors
Male actors from Western Australia
Australian male film actors
20th-century LGBT people
21st-century LGBT people